"Mon cœur résiste encore" is a song by Belgian artist Kate Ryan. It peaked at number seven on the Belgian Singles Chart in 2002 among many other European Charts.  It is the French language version of her first solo hit "Scream for More".

Versions 
The song has three versions. The first version was included on the first edition of the album Different. The 2002 version, which was used as the single mix, with some arrangements, but maintaining its trance sound, and it was included on the album's re-issue. And the 2009 version, which is included in Kate Ryan's French-language Greatest hits album French Connection, has a more dance-oriented sound.

Formats and track listings
Belgian CD Single
"Mon cœur résiste encore" - 3:47
"Mon cœur résiste encore" (Extended Version) - 7:50

Chart performances
In Belgium (Flanders), the single debuted only at #43 on August 31, 2002, but then it made a big jump to #11 and into the top 10, directly to its peak position (#7), in the third week. It stayed for only two weeks in the top 10, but, like the next single Libertine, for 9 weeks in the top 20. After several weeks between #11 and #19, it dropped quickly and fell off the chart (top 50) after 14 weeks, which was average in comparison with the other singles from the album Different.

In Spain, the single had the most success of all, where it jumped directly to its peak position #2 and stayed several weeks in the top 10. In this country, it is the second-most successful single of Kate Ryan, after Ella elle l'a. The positions in other countries were instead a bit disappointing.

Weekly charts

Year-end charts

References

Kate Ryan songs
2002 singles
Songs written by Kate Ryan
2002 songs
EMI Records singles
Songs written by Phil Wilde